Burundi genocide may refer to:

The Ikiza in 1972
The 1993 ethnic violence in Burundi